The original concept for mellow came from founder Patrick Woodcock, a multi-instrumentalist, who had befriended Nicolas Godin (Air) while they were getting their architecture degree in Versailles.  They were brought together by their shared passion for 1960s and 1970s vintage instruments, such as the mellotron, the moog, and other old organs and drum machines, which they both subsequently incorporated in their music. After a short stint with Godin during Air's first incarnation, collaborating on Premiers Symptômes as a musician and arranger, as well as on Moon Safari, and co-writing '"Ce Matin-Là"', Woodcock felt he needed to form his own band.  He called on his old friend Pierre Bégon-Lours, then a sound engineer who had access to a recording studio near Paris where they recorded their first demos in 1997. Another sound engineer, enlisted by Bégon-Lours, joined the band for a couple of years.

Their first concert took place in Brighton, in 1998.  Soon after, they were signed by French independent record label, Atmosphériques. In 1998,  mellow joined forces with Air and Sean Lennon for their first French tour.

The first album, Another Mellow Winter, was released worldwide in 1999. They contacted the director, Roman Coppola, to shoot the video for the single "Another Mellow Winter". In 2000, Coppola asked mellow to score his 1960s-sci-fi debut feature CQ.  At the same time, mellow scored the title track to Novocaine, a dark comedy by David Atkins, starring Steve Martin and Helena Bonham Carter. That year, mellow toured in Japan, the UK and the US.

The soundtrack for CQ was released as mellow's second album in 2001. In between albums, mellow continued to work on other people's music, lending their hand to bands such as Major Deluxe, Nice Hashimoto, The Free Design, Philippe Katerine and Bridge & Tunnel.  They also scored TV commercials (Gauloise cigarettes, EDF, Tommy Hilfiger and Johnson and Johnson).

In 2004, their third album Perfect Colors was released. Woodcock and Bégon-Lours toured with fellow French band Syd Matters.  Their band included Lionel Rault (Flairs), Mark Kerr (Simple Minds, Rita Mitsouko) and Laurent Bauer (Venus Paradise).

They designed their own recording studio in Saint-Cloud, Mellow Workshop, where they could switch roles and produce other artists. Since then, Woodcock and Bégon-Lours have been working on their fourth album, with guest musicians such as Bent (Das Pop), Rémi Alexandre (Syd Matters) and Samy Osta (Domingo), Julien Galner (Chateau Marmont). The next album is slated to be released later in 2015.

Discography

Albums
1999: Another Mellow Winter
2001: Dragonfly (a soundtrack to the motion picture CQ)
2001: Another Mellow Spring (Reissue of "Another Mellow Winter")
2002: Another Mellow Summer (Reissue of "Another Mellow Winter")
2004: Perfect Colors

EPs
2014: City Lights (7" vinyl)

References

Allmusic.com

External links
 Official site

French musical groups
Musical groups established in 1997
1997 establishments in France